The Bravery Council of Australia Meeting 85 Honours List was announced by the Governor General of Australia on 5 May 2016.

Awards were announced for the Star of Courage,
the Bravery Medal,
Commendation for Brave Conduct and
Group Bravery Citation.

Star of Courage (SC)

Nicholas William Thomson, South Australia

Bravery Medal with Bar
David Key  - Victoria

Bravery Medal (BM)

Katie Abbott - New South Wales
Sandro Luigi Agnoletto - Victoria
Luke William Ashman - South Australia
Lucas Baldwin - Victoria
Ricky Lee Bromfield - Western Australia
Michael William Curran - Queensland
Lucas John Dowson - Victoria
Mark Patrick Hickey - New South Wales
Constable Guy Roland Lalor - Queensland Police Service
Senior Sergeant Jeffrey Warren Lansdown - Queensland Police Service
Brock Lawrence - New South Wales
Christopher James Lofdahl - South Australia
Christopher John Meacham - Victoria
 Leading Seaman Bradley John Meek - New South Wales
David Edward Ellis - Queensland
Charles Allan Mitchell - New South Wales
Ronald Albert Morasso - New South Wales
Bradley William Morrison - Queensland
Lisa Dianne Morrow - Australian Capital Territory
George Keith Picone - Victoria
Sergeant Michael John Prickett - Queensland Police Service
Christian Anthony Pyke - South Australia
 Paul Richard Rossington - New South Wales
Sergeant Conrad Wayne van Egmond - Queensland Police Service

Commendation for Brave Conduct

Nicholas Edward Barnett - New South Wales
Jade-Elle Piper Brown - Queensland
Declan Jesse Burnett - Victoria
Daniel David Cannon - Western Australia
Sarah Elizabeth Day - Northern Territory
Senior Constable Michael Dietrich - New South Wales Police Force
Rachel Elise Ehlbeck - New South Wales
Neil Phillip Farnsworth - Victoria
Jordan John Headrick - Queensland
Steven David Hird - Queensland
Desleigh Lorraine Jones - Queensland
Senior Constable Patrick Edward Larkins - South Australia Police
Peter James Lee - South Australia - South Australia
John Matthew McCarthy - Queensland
Neil Andrew Maher - Australian Capital Territory
Dr David Mills - Queensland
Frank Nesci - Victoria
Genene Marie O'Neill - Queensland
Chevon Stephanie Parker - New South Wales
Stephen Pinczi - New South Wales
Ma'afu-Leka Okusitino Ratah - New South Wales
Edward Daniel Reece - Australian High Commission, Fiji
Stephen Rex Richards - Queensland
Glenn Michael Schwartz - South Australia
Anthony Paul Seers - Queensland
Tyronne Shaquille Taukamo - New South Wales
David Joseph Wood - New South Wales

Group Bravery Citation

Awardees are members of the public and Queensland Police, Fire and Ambulance Services who assisted in the rescue of a driver from a chemical laden truck which had crashed at Angellala Creek, Charleville. Queensland on 5 September 2014.
Jimmy Wayne Bateman
Timothy John Bunyan
Constable Logan Tristan De Costa - Queensland Police Service
Senior Constable Mark Patrick Everitt - Queensland Police Service
John Norman Gilbert
Peter Robert Hackwood
Michael Bradley Hadj
Senior Constable Kenric Robert Head - Queensland Police Service
Inspector Stephen Edwin Kersley - Queensland Police Service
Clinten Thomas McCarthy
Senior Constable Judith Heather McGrath - Queensland Police Service
Senior Sergeant Adrian Paul Reick - Queensland Police Service
Jake Paul Sullivan
Nathan James Thompson
Liam Colin Walsh

Awardees are members of the public and Queensland Police who rescued a man from a burning house at Upper Mount Gravatt, Queensland on 2 May 2015.
Teimoor Amin
Matthew Lucas Greenhalgh
Michael Hayes
Samuel Elijah Hirvi
Senior Constable Basil Gilbert van Dongen - Queensland Police Service

Awardees are members of the public and Queensland Police who went to the assistance of a driver when his semi-trailer overturned at Rockhampton, Queensland on 4 January 2010.
Senior Constable Dean Magarry - Queensland Police Service
Senior Constable Megan Leanne Magarry 
Hannah Louise Nugent

Awardees are members of the public and Queensland Police who went to the assistance of a man who was trapped in an overturned truck at Bald Hills, Queensland on 9 September 2013.
Acting Sergeant Kerrianne Maree Edwards - Queensland Police Service
Senior Constable Matthew John Grace - Queensland Police Service
Riley Heather Lye
Senior Constable Michael John McGahan - Queensland Police Service
Senior Constable Alan Gregory Montgomery - Queensland Police Service
Senior Constable Kurt Norman Mudgeway - Queensland Police Service
Alan James Staines

Awardees are members of Queensland Police who assisted in the apprehension of a man armed with two knives at Dalby, Queensland on 29 November 1997.
Gregory David Drain
Senior Constable Peter Anthony Horn - Queensland Police Service
Senior Constable Ian Gregory Potter - Queensland Police Service

Awardees are members of the public and Queensland Police who assisted in the rescue of people from a mini bus trapped in flood waters at Kallangur, Queensland on 1 May 2015.

Sergeant Ian Robert Grafton - Queensland Police Service
Brian Thomas Keogh
Senior Constable Robert James Rafferty - Queensland Police Service
Mark John Saunders

Awardees are members of the public who assisted in the rescue and evacuation of a group of skiers following an avalanche on Maedake Mountain, Aomori, Japan on 14 February 2007.
David Gerard Brown
Roger Gordon Campbell
 Jonathan Keith Disher
Glenn Geoffrey Kirkwood
Ross Philip McSwiney
Mark Hounsell Spilsbury
David Ross Stewart-Thomson

References

Orders, decorations, and medals of Australia
2016 awards
May 2016 events in Australia
2016 in Australia